Polara may refer to 

Polara (band), an American rock band
Polara (album), a 1995 album by the band
Polara Golf, an American golf ball manufacturer
Dodge Polara, an automobile model

See also
Polari
Polaris (disambiguation)